Eddie Deon Moore (born July 5, 1980) is a former American football linebacker who played three seasons for the Miami Dolphins of the National Football League. A two-year  starter at the University of Tennessee, Moore was selected as the 49th pick of the 2003 NFL Draft by the Dolphins. However, his career was shorted by a serious knee injury.

College career 
Moore went to high school in South Pittsburg, Tennessee. He was a four-year letterman and two-year starter at the University of Tennessee and finished his career with 219 tackles, six sacks, 13 pass deflections, two forced fumbles and a fumble recovery. He a team captain and MVP his senior year.

NFL career 
Moore was selected in the second round (49th overall selection) by the Miami Dolphins in the 2003 NFL Draft.  Moore injured his foot in a preseason game against the Tampa Bay Buccaneers and had surgery, forcing him to miss the entire 2003 season. Moore played in 12 games during the 2004 season, starting four.  He recorded 46 tackles, 12 in special teams, and a forced fumble. Moore was a starter until he sustained a knee injury. He tried to battle back in 2005 after undergoing two knee surgeries. However, he never recovered and was released injured in 2006. Moore was out the entire 2006 season. He signed with Denver in 2007, but didn't make it to training camp. The injuries he sustained in Miami never fully healed. His career ended in Denver, he had three more surgeries on his knee before he finally retired.

References 

American football linebackers
Living people
1980 births
Miami Dolphins players
Denver Broncos players
Tennessee Volunteers football players
People from Marion County, Tennessee